Bulungkol Township (بۇلۇڭكۆل يېزىسى) is a township of Akto County in Xinjiang Uygur Autonomous Region, China. Located in the middle west of the county, the township covers an area of 4,585 square kilometers with a population of 7,133 (as of 2017). It has 5 administrative villages under its jurisdiction. Its seat is at Bulungkol Village .

Name

The name of Bulungkol is from Kyrgyz language, meaning "lake in the corner", it was named after the Bulungkol Lake in its territory.

History
In 1955, Bulungkol was transferred to Akto County from Tashkurgan County.

In 1959, Bulungkol Commune was established.

In 1967, Bulungkol Commune was renamed Fanxiu Commune ('anti-revisionism commune' ).

In 1984, Fanxiu Commune became Bulungkol Township.

Geography

The township of Bulungkol is located on the Pamir Plateau, in the southwest of Akto County, between east longitude 74°36′- 75°37′ and north latitude 38°10′- 38°58′. It is bordered by Barin Township and Kirzilto Township to the east, by the town of Oytak to the north, by Muji Township to the west, and by Tashkurgan County and the Republic of Tajikistan to the south. The township has an  border with neighboring Tajikistan, with 8 mountain passes connecting the two.

The mountains of Kongur Tagh and Muztagh Ata are cascaded, the gullies are horizontal and vertical, and the peaks are covered with snow all year round. Bulungkol Township's landscape also includes a number of lakes and springs.

Flora and fauna 
The township is home to rare wild animals, such as the snowcock, snow leopard, procapra przewalskii and argali. There is also rare vegetation such as sand holly and snow lotus.

Geology 

The mineral resources mainly include metal mines such as iron, gold and copper, and non-metallic minerals such as diamond, granite and muscovite.

Climate 

Administrative divisions
Bulungkol Township governs the following five administrative villages:
 Bulungkol (بۇلۇڭكۆل كەنت, Bulunkou ) 
 Gez (Gaizi, Gaizicun) 
 Qiake'er'aigele (Qiake’er Aigelecun) 
 Subax (Subashi), location of Kongur Tagh (公格尔九别峰)
 Tuogayi
These administrative villages also include a number of natural villages, which do not serve as administrative divisions, such as the village of Qarjayit.

Demographics

, the population of Bulungkol Township was 99.9% Kyrgyz.

Economy
Animal husbandry is the main component of Bulungkol's economy, producing Subashi Large-tailed Sheep. Mineral resources include iron, copper, spodumene, beryl, muscovite and others.

Transportation
 China National Highway 314, part of the Karakoram Highway

Tourism 
The main tourist attractions are Karakul Lake, a designated national tourist attraction, and Baisha Mountain.

See also
 China–Tajikistan border

References 

Township-level divisions of Akto County